Okieriete "Oak" Onaodowan (born August 16, 1987) is a Nigerian-American actor and singer known for originating the dual roles of Hercules Mulligan and James Madison in the 2015 musical Hamilton and the role of Dean Miller in the ABC drama and Grey's Anatomy spin-off series Station 19.

Early life
Onaodowan was born in Newark, New Jersey, to Nigerian parents. He and his five sisters were raised in West Orange, New Jersey, He attended Gregory Elementary School and Roosevelt Middle School and West Orange High School, graduating in 2005. Onaodowan briefly played football for his high school, but he stopped after an injury during practice. As a result of the injury, Onaodowan started to explore acting as an alternative extracurricular activity. While attending high school, he began performing with the New Jersey Youth Theatre. After high school, Onaodowan auditioned for and was accepted to the Mason Gross School of the Arts at Rutgers University. He attended for one year.

Career
Onaodowan had roles in Rocky the Musical and Cyrano de Bergerac on Broadway and was in the ensemble of the first national tour of American Idiot. He had the leading role in Young Jean Lee's 2009 play, The Shipment, and played the title role in J.C. Lee's Luce.

By 2015, Onaodowan was an experienced stage actor. He also had several screen credits, including Lou in the feature film Thanks for Sharing and roles in the TV series Gravity and Blue Bloods. He originated the roles of James Madison and Hercules Mulligan in the musical Hamilton on Broadway. He won a Grammy Award as part of the cast album of Hamilton.

On July 11, 2017, he took on the role of Pierre in the musical Natasha, Pierre, and the Great Comet of 1812, replacing the outgoing Josh Groban. He took his final bow in this musical on August 13, 2017.

In 2018, he began playing the role of firefighter Dean Miller in the Grey's Anatomy spin-off Station 19. On November 11, 2021, he exited the series, and his character was killed off onscreen. Deadline reported that Onaodowan had asked to leave in order to pursue other opportunities.

In 2023, he will join Jessica Chastain in a revival of A Doll's House, directed by Jamie Lloyd and adapted by Amy Herzog. The play is a strict 16 week production that ends in June 2023.

Credits

Theatre
Langston in Harlem, off-Broadway
Neighbors, off-Broadway
The Shipment, off-off-Broadway
Ruined
Huntington Theatre Company
La Jolla Playhouse
Berkeley Repertory Theatre
Ragtime, Coalhouse, New Jersey Performing Arts Center
The Last Days of Judas Iscariot, Pontius Pilate, off-off-Broadway, 2004
American Idiot, Rock & Roll Boyfriend/Favorite Son (u/s), US Tour, 2011
Cyrano de Bergerac, Cadet/Pastry Cook/Sentry/Carbon de Castel-Jaloux (u/s)/Cuigy (u/s)/Musketeer (u/s), Broadway, 2012
Luce, Luce, off-Broadway, 2013
The Shipment, off-Broadway, 2013
The Brothers Size, Old Globe Theatre, 2013
The Royale, Old Globe Theatre, 2014
Rocky, Dipper Riley/Apollo's Cornerman/Apollo Creed (u/s), Broadway, 2014
Hamilton, Hercules Mulligan/James Madison
The 52nd Street Project Workshop, 2014
Off-Broadway, 2015
Broadway, 2015–16
Natasha, Pierre, and the Great Comet of 1812, Pierre, Broadway, 2017
A Doll's House, Nills Krogstead, Broadway, 2023

Filmography

Film

Television

Stage

Awards, nominations and recognition

Onaodowan was included in the Forbes 30 Under 30 Hollywood & Entertainment list in 2016 for his acting in Hamilton.

References

External links
 
 

Living people
American male film actors
American male television actors
American male voice actors
African-American male actors
21st-century African-American people
21st-century American male actors
Musicians from Newark, New Jersey
Grammy Award winners
American people of Nigerian descent
Male actors from New Jersey
People from West Orange, New Jersey
West Orange High School (New Jersey) alumni
1987 births